Jozo Stanić (born 6 April 1999) is a professional footballer who plays as a centre-back for Prva HNL club Varaždin, on loan from FC Augsburg. Born in Germany, he has most recently represented Croatia at youth level.

Career
Stanić signed his first professional contract with FC Augsburg in July 2018, lasting four years until 30 June 2022. He made his professional debut for Augsburg in the Bundesliga on 10 February 2019, coming on as a substitute in the 88th minute for Daniel Baier in the 0–4 away loss against Werder Bremen.

In August 2020, Stanić extended his contract with Augsburg by a further year to the summer of 2023 and joined 3. Liga side FSV Zwickau on a season-long loan.

References

External links
 
 
 
 

1999 births
Living people
German people of Croatian descent
Sportspeople from Augsburg
Footballers from Bavaria
Association football central defenders
German footballers
Germany youth international footballers
Croatian footballers
Croatia youth international footballers
TSV Schwaben Augsburg players
FC Augsburg II players
FC Augsburg players
FSV Zwickau players
SV Wehen Wiesbaden players
NK Varaždin (2012) players
Bundesliga players
Regionalliga players
3. Liga players
Croatian Football League players